A Tale of Two Cities is a 1922 British silent drama film directed by Walter Courtney Rowden and starring Clive Brook, Ann Trevor and J. Fisher White. The film is an adaptation of the 1859 novel A Tale of Two Cities by Charles Dickens, and its plot concerns events taking place during the French Revolution. It was made as part of the "Tense Moments with Great Authors Series" of films.

Premise
During the French Revolution, a jaundiced British lawyer takes the place of a French aristocrat who has been sentenced to the guillotine.

Cast
 Clive Brook as Sydney Carton
 Ann Trevor as Lucie Manette
 J. Fisher White as Doctor Alexandre Manette

Bibliography
 Scott, Ian. From Pinewood to Hollywood: British Filmmakers in American Cinema, 1910-1969. Palgrave MacMillan, 2010.

External links
 

1922 films
British historical drama films
British silent short films
1920s historical drama films
Films set in the 1790s
Films directed by Walter Courtney Rowden
Films set in London
Films set in Paris
Films based on A Tale of Two Cities
British black-and-white films
1922 drama films
1920s English-language films
1920s British films
Silent drama films